Microbathyphantes is a genus of dwarf spiders that was first described by P. J. van Helsdingen in 1985.

Species
 it contains five species:
Microbathyphantes aokii (Saito, 1982) – China, Vietnam, Japan
Microbathyphantes celebes Tanasevitch, 2012 – Indonesia (Sulawesi)
Microbathyphantes palmarius (Marples, 1955) (type) – Sri Lanka, India, Seychelles, Myanmar, Thailand, Polynesia
Microbathyphantes spedani (Locket, 1968) – Cameroon, Nigeria, Angola
Microbathyphantes tateyamaensis (Oi, 1960) – Japan

See also
 List of Linyphiidae species (I–P)

References

Araneomorphae genera
Linyphiidae
Spiders of Africa
Spiders of Asia